Beggin’ Strips is a brand of pet food and pet snack manufactured by Nestlé Purina PetCare. The product was first manufactured by Ralston Purina. The product's tagline is "Dogs Don't Know It's Not Bacon," which appeared in U.S. television commercials in the 1990s. The product is manufactured to resemble bacon strips.

History
Beggin' Strips were first sold in 1993. Nestlé Purina started off by selling this product in North America.

Nutrition

Purina Beggin' Strips contain some bacon and include other ingredients such as sodium nitrite and BHA as preservatives and   corn gluten meal, wheat flour, ground yellow corn, water, sugar, glycerin, soybean meal, hydrogenated starch hydrolysate, phosphoric acid, sorbic acid, natural and artificial smoke flavors.  The product comes in a variety of flavors.

Marketing
The trademark bag for the product features a cartoon dog licking his chops while awaiting a treat. Drawn up in 1994, the dog was named "Hamlet." Hamlet was chosen to appear in Nestlé Purina's advertising for Beggin' Strips, and to represent the product.

Purina holds an annual pet parade around the time of Mardi Gras. The Parade, originally sponsored by Purina Beggin’ Strips, and now a general Purina event, is held every year in Soulard, a historic French neighborhood in St. Louis, Missouri with over 5,000 pets and their owners in attendance.  St. Louis' Waterloo Courier also covered the Beggin' Strips Stupid Dog Contest on July 4, 1999. In prior years, the contest offered multiple monetary prizes, the grand prize being a $5,000 supply of Beggin' Strips per year and a trip to see the Late Show with David Letterman in New York.

References

Further reading

External links
 

Dog food brands
Nestlé brands
Ralston Purina products